Philotheca tubiflora is a species of flowering plant in the family Rutaceae and is endemic to Western Australia. It is a compact, much-branched with more or less cylindrical leaves and white to pale pink flowers arranged singly on the ends of branchlets. It is only known from the western edge of the Great Victoria Desert.

Description
The ten stamens are joined to the petal tube and densely hairy above.

Taxonomy
Philotheca tubiflora was first described in 1971 by Alex George in the journal Nuytsia from specimens he collected near Laverton, where it was growing on a "rocky hill with Callitris hugelii". At the time, it was the first record of a Philotheca in Western Australia.

Distribution and habitat
This philotheca grows on rocky outcrops near Laverton on the western edge of the Great Victoria Desert in Western Australia.

Conservation status
Philotheca tubiflora is classified as "Priority One" by the Government of Western Australia Department of Parks and Wildlife, meaning that it is known from only one or a few locations which are potentially at risk.

References

tubiflora
Plants described in 1920
Rosids of Western Australia
Sapindales of Australia
Taxa named by Alex George